Victorian America is the second album by Emily Jane White released on October 9, 2009, in France by Talitres Records and on April 27, 2010, in the U.S. by Milan Records.

Critical reception

Allmusic gave a positive review, commenting that "White sticks with the formula, and ekes out another quiet triumph." By contrast, Slant Magazine opined that "there's a measure of sustained dreariness in the middling fulfillment of low expectations."

Chart performance
Victorian America debuted and peaked at #113 on the French Albums Chart.  It spent a total of 6 weeks on the chart, becoming her highest and longest charting album to date.

Promotion
Longtime collaborator Cam Archer directed the music videos for "Victorian America" (2009) and "A Shot Rang Out" (2010).

The song "Liza" was featured on Pitchfork Media's Forkcast list.

Track listing

Personnel
Cam Archer - photography
Nick Bobetsky - executive producer
Jean-Christophe Chamboredon - executive producer
Josh Fossgreen - bass (upright)
Jennifer Grady - arranger, cello, vocals
Ross Harris - arranger, drums, mixing
Wainwright Hewlett - producer, engineer, mixing
Carey Lamprecht -  violin, arranger, vocals
Jake Mann - arranger, bass (electric)
Henry Nagle	 - pedal steel, arranger, guitar (electric)
Josh Staples	- design
Emily Jane White - organ, guitar, percussion, piano, arranger, composer, vocals, producer

Charts

References

2009 albums
Emily Jane White albums